Ashok Kurjibhai Patel (born 6 March 1957, in Bhavnagar, India) is a former Indian cricketer. He played domestic cricket for Saurashtra and played eight One Day Internationals for India in 1984–85. He is currently the coach of the Gujarat State Cricket Team. He is also currently the coach in CricMax, NJ.

References
 

Saurashtra cricketers
Indian cricketers
India One Day International cricketers
West Zone cricketers
1957 births
Living people